Wriggle may refer to:

Wriggle room
Wriggle River, tributary of the River Yeo (South Somerset)
Wriggle (EP), an EP by American experimental hip hop group Clipping
Les Wriggles, French music group that formed in 1995
Wriggle Nightbug, fictional character from Touhou Project

See also
Wriggler (disambiguation)